The Jiadhal River is a northern sub-tributary of the Brahmaputra River in the Indian state of Assam. The river originates from the hills of Arunachal Pradesh. The Jiadhali river flows through the Dhemaji district and  takes the name of Kumotiya River from Gogamukh.The river finally joins Subansiri river, a major tributary of Brahmaputra River. Jiadhal River is known as ‘Sorrow of Dhemaji’ for the heavy damage caused by annual flood and erosion.

References 

Rivers of Assam
Rivers of India